The Hangzhou–Quzhou high-speed railway is a high-speed railway line currently under construction in Zhejiang Province, China. It is expected to open in 2023.

History
Construction began on 28 March 2019.

Stations
(through service to )

 (reserved station)

References

High-speed railway lines in China